Hans Krag may refer to:
Hans Hagerup Krag (1829–1907), Norwegian engineer
Hans Krag (author) (1904–1984), Norwegian author on heraldry